The 2013 Brisbane International was a joint 2013 ATP World Tour and 2013 WTA Tour tennis tournament, played on outdoor hard courts in Brisbane, Queensland. It was the 5th edition of the tournament and took place at the Queensland Tennis Centre in Tennyson. It was held from 30 December 2012 to 6 January 2013. It was part of the Australian Open Series in preparation for the first Grand Slam of the year.

Points and prize money

Point distribution

Prize money

* per team

ATP singles main-draw entrants

Seeds

1 Rankings as of December 24, 2012

Other entrants
The following players received wildcards into the singles main draw:
  Matthew Ebden
  Lleyton Hewitt
  Ben Mitchell

The following players received entry from the qualifying draw:
  Ryan Harrison
  Denis Kudla
  Jesse Levine
  John Millman

The following player received entry as lucky loser:
  Igor Kunitsyn

Withdrawals
Before the tournament
  Paul-Henri Mathieu (personal reasons)
  Radek Štěpánek (eye infection)

Retirements
  Jarkko Nieminen (migraine)
  Kei Nishikori (left knee injury)

ATP doubles main-draw entrants

Seeds

1 Rankings as of December 24, 2012

Other entrants
The following pairs received wildcards into the doubles main draw:
  Chris Guccione /  Lleyton Hewitt 
  Matthew Ebden /  Marinko Matosevic

The following pair received entry as alternates:
  John Peers /  John-Patrick Smith

Withdrawals
  Radek Štěpánek (eye infection)

Retirements
  Kei Nishikori (left knee injury)

WTA singles main-draw entrants

Seeds

1 Rankings as of December 24, 2012

Other entrants
The following players received wildcards into the singles main draw:
  Jarmila Gajdošová
  Olivia Rogowska

The following players received entry from the qualifying draw:
  Bojana Bobusic
  Ksenia Pervak
  Olga Puchkova
  Monica Puig

The following player received entry as lucky loser:
  Lesia Tsurenko

Withdrawals
Before the tournament
  Maria Sharapova (right collarbone injury)
During the tournament
  Victoria Azarenka (toe injury)

WTA doubles main-draw entrants

Seeds

1 Rankings as of December 24, 2012

Other entrants
The following pairs received wildcards into the doubles main draw: − 
  Jarmila Gajdošová /  Olivia Rogowska

Champions

Men's singles

 Andy Murray def.  Grigor Dimitrov 7–6(7–0), 6–4
It was Murray's 25th career title.

Women's singles

 Serena Williams def.  Anastasia Pavlyuchenkova 6–2, 6–1
It was Serena's 47th career title, 4th Premier-level title, and 8th overall Premier title. She has now won her past 16 matches.

Men's doubles

 Marcelo Melo /  Tommy Robredo def.  Eric Butorac /  Paul Hanley, 4–6, 6–1, [10–5]

Women's doubles

 Bethanie Mattek-Sands /  Sania Mirza def.  Anna-Lena Grönefeld /  Květa Peschke 4–6, 6–4, [10–7]

References

External links
Official website

 
2013 ATP World Tour
2013 WTA Tour
2013 in Australian tennis
2013
December 2012 sports events in Australia
January 2013 sports events in Australia